Malombra is an 1881 novel by the Italian writer Antonio Fogazzaro. It is a Gothic story set close to Lake Como in the mid-Nineteenth century. It was Fogazzaro's debut novel.

Synopsis
A young woman living in a castle, comes to believe that she is the returned spirit of a former aristocrat who once live there.

Adaptations
The novel was turned into films on two occasions: a 1917 silent film directed by Carmine Gallone and a 1942 film directed by Mario Soldati. In 1974 the story was adapted as a miniseries for Italian television.

References

Bibliography
 Brand, Peter & Pertile, Lino. The Cambridge History of Italian Literature. Cambridge University Press, 1999.

1881 novels
19th-century Italian novels
Italian Gothic novels
Novels set in Italy
Novels by Antonio Fogazzaro
Italian novels adapted into films